Citizens' Movement is a political party in Mexico. Dante Delgado Rannauro was its first leader. It was initially known as Convergence for Democracy, but the name was shortened to simply Convergence in August 2002. In July 2011, it was reformed as the Citizens' Movement. Since the 4th of December 2018, Clemente Castañeda has been the head of the party as part of a new wave of young leaders.

Convergence was founded as a "national political grouping" in 1997. It attained registered party status in 1999 and participated in federal elections in the 2000 general election as a component in the "Alliance for Mexico" (Alianza por México), whose (unsuccessful) presidential candidate was Cuauhtémoc Cárdenas. In that election, as its part of the alliance's share, it was awarded one Senate seat and two in the Chamber of Deputies.

The party describes itself as a social-democratic. The electoral colours of the party before 2011 were blue and orange, and the party logo was a blue circle, superimposed by an orange eagle and the word Convergencia. The party was renamed the Citizens' Movement and reformed on 31 July 2011, with its new official logo becoming an orange square with a white eagle.

The party is positioned to the right of Morena. They are squarely pro-business, and believe in restructuring the economy by reducing regulation and state-owned monopolies.

History 

The party contested the 2003 mid-term congressional election as an independent (unallied) party, and was rewarded with 2.3% of the popular vote and five seats in the Chamber of Deputies.  it governed 28 municipalities in various parts of the country.

In the 2006 general election, Convergence allied itself with the Party of the Democratic Revolution and the Labor Party to form the Alliance for the Good of All coalition, whose presidential candidate was Andrés Manuel López Obrador. The party won 17 out of 500 seats in the Chamber of Deputies and 5 out of 128 Senators. It is known for its song "Movimiento Naranja" which has 41 million views on YouTube, which became a popular meme in the Hispanic community.

Electoral history

Presidential elections

Congressional elections

Chamber of Deputies

Senate elections

References 

 
Political parties in Mexico
Progressive Alliance